23S rRNA (uridine2552-2'-O)-methyltransferase (Um(2552) 23S ribosomal RNA methyltransferase, heat shock protein RrmJ, RrmJ, FTSJ, Um2552 methyltransferase) is an enzyme with systematic name S-adenosyl-L-methionine:23S rRNA (uridine2552-2'-O-)-methyltransferase. This enzyme catalyses the following chemical reaction

 S-adenosyl-L-methionine + uridine2552 in 23S rRNA  S-adenosyl-L-homocysteine + 2'-O-methyluridine2552 in 23S rRNA

The enzyme catalyses the 2'-O-methylation of the universally conserved U2552 in the A loop of 23S rRNA.

References

External links 
 

EC 2.1.1